Geleen Oost is a railway station located in Geleen, Netherlands. The station opened in 1896 and is located on the Sittard–Herzogenrath railway. The station is operated by Arriva. Until December 2006 the Haarlem–Heerlen Intercity service called at this station.

Train services
The following local train services call at this station:
Stoptrein: Sittard–Heerlen–Kerkrade

External links
NS website 
Dutch public transport travel planner 

Railway stations in Sittard-Geleen
Railway stations opened in 1893